In 1919, Philadelphia adopted a new city charter. Among the changes enacted was a reduction of the size of the two-chambered, 190-member City Council to a unicameral, smaller body. The city was divided into eight districts, which elected multiple members based on their relative populations. The system stayed in place until 1951, when a new city charter changed the system to a different model.

1920 – 1952

Notes

See also
List of members of Philadelphia City Council since 1952

Government of Philadelphia

City council 1920